Cave Creek may refer to:

Cave Creek, Arizona, a town in Arizona
Cave Creek, Tennessee, an unincorporated community in Tennessee
Cave Creek / Kotihotiho, a stream on the West Coast of New Zealand
The Cave Creek disaster in New Zealand's Paparoa National Park, in which fourteen people died
Cave Creek (Boone County), a stream in Missouri
Cave Creek (Petite Saline Creek), a stream in Missouri
Cave Creek School, Gillespie County, Texas
Cave Creek (PCH), the codename for an Intel chipset